Euschistus latimarginatus is a species of stink bug in the family Pentatomidae. It is found in North America.

References

Articles created by Qbugbot
Insects described in 1910
Pentatomini